The 1970 1000 km of Monza was an endurance race held at the Autodromo Nazionale Monza, Monza, Italy on April 25, 1970. It was the fourth round of the 1970 International Championship for Makes. This was the first official 1000 km race at Monza that used only the road course; in 1956 and 1965-1969 the organizers utilized the combined road and banking courses; but the banking was abandoned because of safety issues; the 1969 1000 km race was the last race ever held on the concrete-surfaced banking. Mexican driver Pedro Rodríguez won this race in John Wyer's Gulf-sponsored Porsche 917K, he was able to hold off 3 hard-charging works Ferrari 512's after his co-driver Leo Kinnunen lost most of the lead Rodríguez had built up. Ex-Ferrari driver John Surtees returned to Ferrari after 4 years to drive a works 512.

Official results

Not Classified

Did Not Finish

Statistics
Pole position: #8 John Wyer Automotive Engineering Porsche 917K (Jo Siffert/Brian Redman) - 1:25.21 (150.971 mph/242.957 km/h)
Fastest lap: #10 Porsche Salzburg Porsche 917K (Vic Elford)- 1:24.8 (151.719 mph/244.104 km/h)
Time taken for winning car to cover scheduled distance: 4 hours, 18 minutes and 1.7 seconds
Average Speed: 232.649 km/h (143.610 mph)
Weather conditions: Sunny

References

Monza
Monza
6 Hours of Monza